Franciskovići is a neighborhood in Boka Kotorska, Montenegro.

Located east of Krašići on the Luštica peninsula, the village was named after the Serbian family Francisković who built it in the 15th century. 

Populated places in Tivat Municipality
Bay of Kotor